The 1929 Ontario general election was the 18th general election held in the Province of Ontario, Canada.  It was held on October 30, 1929, to elect the 112 Members of the 18th Legislative Assembly of Ontario ("MLAs").

The Ontario Conservative Party, led by George Howard Ferguson, was elected for a third consecutive term in government with an increased majority in the Legislature.

The Ontario Liberal Party, led by W.E.N. Sinclair, lost one seat, but continued to form the official opposition.

Conservative gains came at the expense of the Progressive Party and the United Farmers of Ontario.

Earl Hutchinson of Kenora is the sole Labour MLA elected.

Results

|-
! colspan=2 rowspan=2 | Political party
! rowspan=2 | Party leader
! colspan=5 | MPPs
! colspan=3 | Votes
|-
! Candidates
!1926
!Dissol.
!1929
!±
!#
!%
! ± (pp)

|style="text-align:left;"|Howard Ferguson
|112
|72
|72
|90
|18
|574,730
|56.66%
|1.30

|style="text-align:left;"|W.E.N. Sinclair
|84
|14
|14
|13
|1
|326,960
|32.23%
|14.99

|style="text-align:left;"|William Raney
|10
|10
|8
|4
|6
|34,507
|3.40%
|2.92

|
|1
|4
|4
|1
|3
|5,449
|0.54%
|3.45

|style="text-align:left;"|Leslie Oke
|3
|3
|3
|1
|2
|12,752
|1.26%
|0.08

|
|4
|1
|1
|1
|
|10,029
|0.99%
|0.30

|style="text-align:left;"|
|7
|2
|2
|2
|
|21,950
|2.16%
|0.49

|style="text-align:left;"|
|–
|4
|3
|–
|4
|colspan="3"|Did not campaign

|style="text-align:left;"|
|–
|1
|1
|–
|1
|colspan="3"|Did not campaign

|style="text-align:left;"|Liberal-Prohibitionist
|style="text-align:left;"|
|–
|1
|1
|–
|1
|colspan="3"|Did not campaign

|style="text-align:left;"|
|8
|–
|–
|–
|
|25,807
|2.54%
|5.91

|style="text-align:left;"|
|5
|–
|–
|–
|
|1,542
|0.15%
|

|style="text-align:left;"|
|2
|–
|–
|–
|
|587
|0.06%
|0.19

|style="text-align:left;"|Liberal-Labour
|style="text-align:left;"|
|–
|–
|–
|–
|
|colspan="3"|Did not campaign

|style="text-align:left;"|Progressive-Liberal
|style="text-align:left;"|
|–
|–
|–
|–
|
|colspan="3"|Did not campaign

|style="text-align:left;"|Liberal-Labour-Prohibitionist
|style="text-align:left;"|
|–
|–
|–
|–
|
|colspan="3"|Did not campaign

|colspan="3"|
|3
|colspan="5"|
|-style="background:#E9E9E9;"
|colspan="3" style="text-align:left;"|Total
|236
|112
|112
|112
|
|1,014,313
|100.00%
|
|-
|colspan="8" style="text-align:left;"|Blank and invalid ballots
|align="right"|7,749
|style="background:#E9E9E9;" colspan="2"|
|-style="background:#E9E9E9;"
|colspan="8" style="text-align:left;"|Registered voters / turnout
|1,804,937
|56.63%
|7.26
|}

Seats that changed hands

There were 35 seats that changed allegiance in the election:

 Conservative to Liberal
Glengarry
Halton
Renfrew South
Simcoe Centre
Waterloo North

 Conservative to Labour
Kenora

 Conservative to Independent-Conservative
Rainy River

 Liberal to Conservative
Elgin East
Essex South
Frontenac—Lennox
Haldimand
Northumberland
Perth South
Peterborough County
York North

 Progressive to Conservative
Kent East
Lincoln
Middlesex West
Ontario North
Prince Edward

 Progressive to Liberal
Bruce South

 Liberal-Progressive to Conservative
Simcoe Southwest
Victoria South

 Liberal-Progressive to Liberal
Oxford South

 UFO to Conservative
Lambton East
Manitoulin

 Labour to Conservative
Waterloo South

 Independent-Liberal to Conservative
Ottawa East
Russell
Sturgeon Falls

 Independent-Liberal to Independent-Conservative
Prescott

 Independent-Conservative to Conservative
Port Arthur
St. Catharines

 Independent-Progressive to Conservative
Middlesex North

 Liberal-Prohibitionist to Conservative
Dundas

Notes

References

See also
Politics of Ontario
List of Ontario political parties
Premier of Ontario
Leader of the Opposition (Ontario)

Further reading
 

1929 elections in Canada
1929
1929 in Ontario
October 1929 events